Jessica Revell (born 13 December 1994)  is an English actress and singer, best known for her TV role as Mandy "Elektra" Perkins in Tracy Beaker Returns and in the BBC spin-off series The Dumping Ground.

Early and personal life
Revell's parents, who are separated, both worked for British Airways, and she has a brother. Revell spent her childhood travelling due to her parents' jobs and spent some of her childhood in France. Revell returned to the United Kingdom and attended Tring Park School for the Performing Arts as a boarding student. Revell is openly lesbian, and she recently split from her girlfriend Rebecca Hayes.

Career

Acting
Revell's first role was in Tracy Beaker Returns as Elektra Perkins, and she joined in series 2. She reprised the role of Elektra for The Dumping Ground in 2013. She also appeared as Elektra in The Dumping Ground Survival Files and The Dumping Ground Dish Up. In 2015, she appeared in an episode of Casualty as Kelly Bange. Revell appeared in two short roles, Girl to Girl to Monkey in 2014, and in Mingmong as Judy in 2015. She also played Jen in the play People Are Messy.

Singing
Revell released her debut single "Cardiff Kisses" in 2018. She also released the song “Stand by me” which is no longer available.

Revell released her second original single “leave me in pieces” in 2022. Shortly followed by her album “nothing / something / nothing again” on the 16th of January 2023.

Filmography

Video games

Discography

Singles
 "Cardiff Kisses" 25 June 2018
 ”leave me in pieces” 28 November 2022

Albums
 “Nothing/ Something/ Nothing Again” 16th January 2023

References

External links
 
 
 

1994 births
Living people
English television actresses
English child actresses
British child actresses
21st-century English actresses
People educated at Tring Park School for the Performing Arts
English expatriates in France
English emigrants to France
Actresses from London
People from Harlington, London
Bisexual actresses